is a Japanese television drama series based on the mystery novel of the same name by Japanese author Tokuya Higashigawa. It premiered on Fuji TV on October 18, 2011. This drama series was subsequently followed two-hour long special episode, then a film sequel.

Plot
Reiko is a rich heiress to a zaibatsu, but she chose to work as a detective. She resents her superior, Kazamatsuri, who always seem to be making illogical deductions that causes murder cases to become cold cases. One day, her butler suddenly announces his retirement, and he chooses Kageyama as his replacement. Reiko realizes that Kageyama's deduction skills are very good after Kageyama solved a seemingly unsolvable mystery. After that, whenever Reiko meets an unsolvable case, she would lay out the details of the case for Kageyama, and he would explain to her how that particular case is solved after dinner. After every case, Kageyama also explains to Reikko some universal truth or human nature that led to each crime being committed.

Cast
 Sho Sakurai as Kageyama, Reiko Hosho's new butler. He has a special interest in solving mysteries, and helps his mistress solve seemingly unsolvable cases. However, he often shames her whenever she asks for help or when she makes a wrong deduction. He is seemingly good at everything, and has a wide range of general knowledge. Coupled with his observant nature, Kageyama manages to solve every single case almost in his first try.
 Keiko Kitagawa as Reiko Hosho, a rich heiress who has begun working undercover as a police detective. As she lacks deductive skills, she is often forced to turn to Kageyama for help. The young Reiko is played by child actress Cocoa Ito.
 Kippei Shiina as Kyoichiro Kazamatsuri, the head of the Serious Crimes Unit at Kunitachi Police Precinct’s Criminal Affairs Division. A bachelor and quasi career detective, he is also Reiko’s superior. He was promoted to be an inspector at a young age, and is known to show off his status as the son of the millionaire owner of Kazamatsuri Motors. Despite his position, he has a tendency of making ridiculous theories and taking credit for others' more-relevant ideas as if he'd thought them up. However, his ridiculous theories sometimes play an important role in helping Kageyama solve cases.
 Toru Nomaguchi as Seiichi Namiki, an assistant detective under Kazamatsuri. He has a cool personality, which sharply contrasts him with Kazamatsuri.
 Katsuo Nakamura as Satoru Yamashige, a crime scene investigator who is an expert in crime scene forensics.
Anri Okamoto as Azumi Munemori, a female police inspector. Together with Ejiri, they form a duo that worships Kazamatsuri and can be seen serving him during investigation.
 Konatsu Tanaka as Yuka Ejiri, a female police inspector.

Episodes

References

External links
  

2011 Japanese television series debuts
Fuji TV dramas
Japanese drama television series
Television shows based on Japanese novels
Mystery television series